Escallonia resinosa is an evergreen shrub or tree native to the Andean forests of Peru, Bolivia and southern Ecuador from 2600 to 4200 meters above sea level. A component of high Andean forests, it is regarded as an important source of raw materials for the Andean peoples.

Description 
Escallonia resinosa grows as a shrub or tree from 2 to 10 m in height. The trunk has an irregular shape and is often twisted, with a reddish papery bark. Leaves are simple and spirally arranged, often clustered at the end of the branchlets, oblanceolate, 2–3.5 cm long, 0.5–0.7 cm wide, with a finely dentate margin. Flowers are white, small (ca. 1 cm long), and borne in racemes or panicles.

Distribution and habitat 
Escallonia resinosa is found in the Andes, from southern Ecuador to Peru and Bolivia, between 2600 and 4200 m of elevation. It is found in seasonally dry montane forests of mountain slopes, often growing in association with trees of genera Polylepis and Buddleja.

Uses 
Escallonia resinosa is a source of firewood and wood of good quality throughout its range. This tree species furnishes a hard wood for tools and is often used to manufacture chaquitacllas (a tool used for soil plowing) by the indigenous peoples of the Andes since ancient times. The wood was also probably used by the Incas to make a type of ceremonial vases called kero. Leaves are used as a source of a beige color dye applied to cotton and wool.

References 

Trees of Peru
Trees of Ecuador
Trees of Bolivia
resinosa